Megacraspedus monolorellus is a moth of the family Gelechiidae. It was described by Rebel in 1905. It is found in Asia Minor.

The forewings are irrorared with dark brownish-grey with a whitish streak along the margin, narrowing towards the base. The hindwings are deep grey.

References

Moths described in 1905
Megacraspedus